The men's pole vault was a track and field athletics event held as part of the Athletics at the 1904 Summer Olympics programme. It was the third time the event was held. Seven pole vaulters from two nations participated. The competition was held on Saturday, September 3, 1904. The event was won by Charles Dvorak of the United States, the nation's third consecutive victory in the event. With six of the seven vaulters, the United States swept the top three places—the first time that occurred in the pole vault, though the Americans had never had more than two vaulters compete previously. Through the 1904 Games, no American pole vaulter had ever placed lower than any non-American vaulter.

Background
This was the third appearance of the event, which is one of 12 athletics events to have been held at every Summer Olympics. Charles Dvorak, who had expected to compete in 1900 but was foiled by machinations revolving around the Sunday schedule then, was able to compete in 1904. The French world record holder, Fernand Gonder, was not present. Most of the top Americans were; like many events in 1904, it was largely a United States championship.

Germany made its first appearance in the event. The United States made its third appearance, the only nation to have competed at every Olympic men's pole vault to that point.

Competition format
There was a single round of vaulting. The bar was raised by 3 inches each time.

Records
These were the standing world and Olympic records (in metres) prior to the 1904 Summer Olympics.

* unofficial

Charles Dvorak set a new Olympic record of 3.50 metres. All 5 of the vaulters whose results are known bested the previous Olympic record.

Schedule

Results

The tie for second was resolved through a series of jump-offs. In the four-way jump-off, the jumpers started at 3.28 metres, which all succeeded at. Allen and McLanahan were unable to replicate their 3.35 metres success, while Samse and Wilkins both cleared that height as well as the 3.43 metres they had been unable to achieve in the main final. There was then a second series of head-to-head jump-offs; details are not known, though McLanahan beat Allen and Samse beat Wilkins.

References

Sources
 

Athletics at the 1904 Summer Olympics
Pole vault at the Olympics